Pentazocine, sold under the brand name Talwin among others, is a painkiller used to treat moderate to severe pain. It is believed to work by activating (agonizing) κ-opioid receptors (KOR) and μ-opioid receptors (MOR). As such it is called an opioid as it delivers its effects on pain by interacting with the opioid receptors. It shares many of the side effects of other opioids like constipation, nausea, itching, drowsiness and respiratory depression, but unlike most other opioids it fairly frequently causes hallucinations, nightmares and delusions. It is also, unlike most other opioids, subject to a ceiling effect, which is when at a certain dose (which differs from person-to-person) no more pain relief, or side effects, is obtained by increasing the dose any further.

Chemically it is classed as a benzomorphan and it comes in two enantiomers, which are molecules that are exact (non-superimposable) mirror images of one another.

It was patented in 1960 and approved for medical use in 1964. Usually, in its oral formulations, it is combined with naloxone so as to prevent people from crushing the tablets, dissolving them in a solvent (like water) and injecting them for a high (as orally administered naloxone produces no opioid-negating effects, whereas intravenous or intramuscular administration does).

Use

Medical
Pentazocine is used primarily to treat pain, although its analgesic effects are subject to a ceiling effect. It has been discontinued by its corporate sponsor in Australia, although it may be available through the special access scheme.

Recreational
In the 1970s, recreational drug users discovered that combining pentazocine with tripelennamine (a first-generation ethylenediamine antihistamine most commonly dispensed under the brand names Pelamine and Pyribenzamine) produced a euphoric sensation. Since tripelennamine tablets are typically blue in color and brand-name Pentazocine is known as Talwin (hence "Ts"), the pentazocine/tripelennamine combination acquired the slang name Ts and blues.
After health-care professionals and drug-enforcement officials became aware of this scenario, the mu opioid receptor antagonist naloxone was added to oral preparations containing pentazocine to prevent perceived "misuse" via injection, and the reported incidence of its recreational use has declined precipitously since.

Research
In an open-label, add-on, single-day, acute-dose small clinical study, pentazocine was found to rapidly and substantially reduce symptoms of mania in individuals with bipolar disorder that were in the manic phase of the condition. It was postulated that the efficacy observed was due to κ-opioid receptor activation-mediated amelioration of hyperdopaminergia in the reward pathways. Minimal sedation and no side effects including psychotomimetic effects or worsening of psychosis were observed at the dose administered.

Adverse effects

Side effects are similar to those of morphine, but pentazocine, due to its action at the kappa opioid receptor is more likely to invoke psychotomimetic effects. High dose may cause high blood pressure or high heart rate. It may also increase cardiac work after myocardial infarction when given intravenously and hence this use should be avoided where possible. Respiratory depression is a common side effect, but is subject to a ceiling effect, such that at a certain dose the degree of respiratory depression will no longer increase with dose increases. Likewise rarely it has been associated with agranulocytosis, erythema multiforme and toxic epidermal necrolysis.

Tissue damage at injection sites
Severe injection site necrosis and sepsis has occurred (sometimes requiring amputation of limb) with multiple injection of pentazocine lactate. In addition, animal studies have demonstrated that Pentazocine is tolerated less well subcutaneously than intramuscularly.

History
Pentazocine was developed by the Sterling Drug Company, Sterling-Winthrop Research Institute, of Rensselaer, New York. The analgesic compound was first made at Sterling in 1958. U.S. testing was conducted between 1961 and 1967.It was approved by the Food and Drug Administration in June 1967 after being favorably reviewed following testing on 12,000 patients in the United States.  By mid 1967 Pentazocine was already being sold in Mexico, England, and Argentina, under different trade names.

Society and culture

Legal status
Pentazocine was originally unclassified under the Controlled Substances Act. A petition was filed with the Drug Enforcement Administration on October 1, 1971, to shift it to Schedule III. The petition was filed by Joseph L. Fink III, a pharmacist and law student at Georgetown University Law Center as part of the course Lawyering in the Public Interest.  That petition was accepted for review on November 10, 1971. D.E.A. published a Final Rule transferring it to schedule IV on January 10, 1979, with an effective date of February 9, 1979. This is understood to be the first instance of a successful petition to reclassify a substance under the relatively recently enacted Controlled Substances Act. Pentazocine is still classified in Schedule IV under the Controlled Substances Act in the United States, even with the addition of Naloxone. Some states classify it in Schedule II, such as Illinois and South Carolina (injectable form only), or Schedule III such as Kentucky.)  Internationally, pentazocine is a Schedule III drug under the Convention on Psychotropic Substances.  Pentazocine has a DEA ACSCN of 9720; being a Schedule IV substance, the DEA does not assign an annual manufacturing quota for pentazocine for the United States.

Brand names
Pentazocine is sold under several brand names, such as Fortral, Sosegon, Talwin NX (with naloxone), Talwin, Talwin PX, Fortwin and Talacen (with paracetamol (acetaminophen).

See also 
 Cyclazocine (hallucinogenic)
 Volazocine

References

External links 
Eurekalert report on PNAS article

Alkene derivatives
Benzomorphans
Kappa-opioid receptor agonists
Phenols
Sigma agonists
Synthetic opioids